In some rodents, squamae are small tubercles resembling scales on the sole of the hindfeet. Among oryzomyine rodents, their development is variable; most have well-developed squamae, but in others they are indistinct or entirely absent. Delomys sublineatus and Peromyscus maniculatus also have squamae.

References

Literature cited
Voss, R.S., Gómez-Laverde, M. and Pacheco, V. 2002. A new genus for Aepeomys fuscatus Allen, 1912, and Oryzomys intectus Thomas, 1921: Enigmatic muroid rodents from Andean cloud forests. American Museum Novitates 3373:1–42.
Weksler, M. 2006. Phylogenetic relationships of oryzomyine rodents (Muroidea: Sigmodontinae): separate and combined analyses of morphological and molecular data. Bulletin of the American Museum of Natural History 296:1–149.

Rodent anatomy